Thomas G. Asimou (born August 7, 1973) is an American lawyer based in Phoenix, Arizona who specializes in cases involving missing persons.

Biography
 
Asimou obtained his Juris Doctor from USF School of Law in 1998. He also holds a Bachelor of Arts from the University of Arizona and a Master of Laws in Taxation from Boston University.
 
Asimou founded the law firm of Asimou & Associates in 2000. The firm focused on cases such as wills & trusts and commercial litigation. He later began taking missing persons cases to either find their whereabouts or obtain a death declaration from a court. His first experience came from being hired by a life insurance company to defend against a death claim for a missing person. He later found the person living in the Caribbean.
 
Asimou is a member of the Board of Governors for the University of San Francisco School of Law.

References

External links
 Asimou & Associates, PLC

1973 births
Living people
Arizona lawyers
People from Phoenix, Arizona
21st-century American lawyers
University of San Francisco School of Law alumni
University of Arizona alumni
Boston University School of Law alumni